The following is a list of manga publications of the series Yozakura Quartet, consisting of twenty-seven tankōbon volumes. The series revolves around the members of the Hiizumi Life Counseling Office, Akina Hiizumi, a human that can use "tuning" to return yōkai to their world; Hime Yarizakura, a dragon yōkai who is the mayor of the town of Sakurashin; Ao Nanami, a satori with telepathic abilities; and Kotoha Isone, a half-human, half-yōkai who can conjure objects with her words. Together, they protect the townspeople of Sakurashin, a city where humans and yōkai coexist with one another.

All twenty-seven volumes of the manga are published in Japan by Kodansha. The series was originally licensed in North America by Del Rey Manga, who published the first five volumes between February 2008 and September 2009. The company later shut down in 2010, and while most of its titles were picked up for continued publication by Kodansha USA, Yozakura Quartet was not one of them. As a result, the Del Rey publication is now out of print.

Starting in August 2016, Kodansha revived publication of the manga in English as a digital-only series.

Volumes

References 

Yozakura Quartet